Sheffield Tigers Rugby Football Club is a rugby union team based in Sheffield, South Yorkshire, England. They currently play in the fourth tier of the English rugby union league system, National League 2 North, and are based at Dore Moor, Hathersage Road, Sheffield. The club run three senior teams and a veterans side, the junior section starts at under-7's up to a colts XV.

History
Formed in 1932 they celebrate their 75th season of rugby in 2007. Since league rugby began they were long standing members of Yorkshire 2, managing to avoid either promotion or relegation for the first dozen or so years of the leagues.

The arrival of former England and Halifax RLFC David Holmes spearheaded a new era and the club reached the final of the Tetley Bitter Vase at Twickenham in 2000, securing a 20–11 win over favourites Bank of England RUFC. Despite finishing second, a restructure of the leagues meant that they remained in Yorkshire 2; as all ten clubs below them were relegated! Promotion the following year was accompanied by the club's first Yorkshire Shield win over Scarborough and the 'Tigers' stayed in Yorkshire 1 for two seasons before a disastrous campaign in 2002–03 saw them relegated back to Yorkshire 2.

The arrival of coach Richard Selkirk and a host of new players saw Tigers promoted at the second time of asking in 2004–05, a year that also saw a second Vase win at Twickenham, this time over Solihull after a tumultuous semi-final win at Sidmouth.

Further success followed in 2005–06 with the Yorkshire 1 title captured, and at their first attempt Tigers made it three promotions in a row in 2006–07 with a play-off win over North 2 West rivals Lymm to book their place in  North 1 for 2007–08. Three seasons later the club gained promotion from this league, now known as National 3 North, via a play-off victory over Chester.

Honours
 Tetley/Powergen Junior Vase winners (2): 1999–00, 2004–05
 Yorkshire Shield winners: 2000–01
 South Yorkshire Trophy winners (3): 2003–04, 2004–05, 2005–06
 Yorkshire League 2 champions: 2004–05
 Yorkshire League 1 champions:  2005–06
 North 2 (east v west) promotion play-off winners: 2006–07
 National League 3 (north v midlands) promotion play-off winner: 2010–11
 National League 3 North champions: 2015–16

Current standings

References

External links
 Official site

English rugby union teams
Rugby clubs established in 1932
Rugby union in Yorkshire
Tigers